'Make It Happen' is the second full-length album released by the band Nizlopi in March 2008, following an EP released 2 years previously. The album was preceded by the single "Start Beginning".

Track listing
 Tape Spooling  
 Start Beginning [feat. IDMC Choir]  
 I'm Alive  
 Find Me  
 Feel Inside  
 Last Night in Dakar  
 Drop Your Guard  
 The One  
 Part of Me  
 Without You  
 England UpRise [feat. Ben Zephaniah]  
 Love Is  
 Flooded Quarry [feat. Rory McLeod]  
 If You Care About It  
 Lay Down

Nizlopi albums
2008 albums